Créteil–Préfecture is a station on line 8 of the Paris Métro in the commune of Créteil. It was the eastern terminus of the line and is on the surface.

The station opened on 10 September 1974 with the extension of the line from Créteil–L'Échat. Its name refers to the nearby prefecture (administrative headquarters of the department) of the Val-de-Marne.

The  Créteil lake was opened nearby in 1970 in a former quarry.

Créteil–Préfecture became a through station when line 8 was extended 1.3 km east to Pointe du Lac on 8 October 2011.

Station layout

References
Roland, Gérard (2003). Stations de métro. D’Abbesses à Wagram. Éditions Bonneton.

Paris Métro stations in Créteil
Railway stations in France opened in 1974
Paris Métro line 8